Dinakrushna Dasa (1650–1710) was an Odia poet, belonging to the Vaishnava tradition of Bhakti movement. He is known for his Odia poem titled "Rasakallola", which is devoted to Lord Krishna. Among his many literary compositions, "Artatrana Chautisa" is a reputed one. Dinakrusna's Rasakallola and his standalone compositions including "chaupadi", "prabhati", "janana", "chautisa", "bhajana", and "malasri" are central to the repertoire of Odissi music, the traditional classical music of the state.

Biography

Born at Munutunia in Balasore district. Famous for his book ‘Rasakallola’, which describe the Divine Leela of Radha and  Krishna and to be a staunch devotee of Lord Jagannath at Puri. Dinakrushna Dasa is an outstanding Odia poet of the medieval Odia literature. Not many details about him are available. He was born in Jaleswar in the State of Odisha and was contemporary of Mukunda Deva (1651–1686 A.D.) and Divyasingha Deva (1686–1713 A.D.) the then kings of Odisha. A major part of his life was spent in Puri. His mastery over varied subjects like Sanskrit poetics, grammar, astrology, classical medicine etc., made him a figure of eminence. But his domestic life was fraught with continued poverty and ailments. The ruler of Odisha, the then king of Puri, promised him many allurements provided he wrote a panegyric in the king's honour. The poet rejected all such offers and remained resolute in glorifying only Jagannatha through his writings. It is said that he was inflicted with the leprosy and yet he used to visit the Puri temple of Jagannath and sing his devotional songs in a most moving voice every day. He spent the last of his days at Ekagharia, Dhenkanal near Bramhni rives. At his death place at the Jagannath temple, which was known constructed on the name of Sarana Srikhetra.
 
Dinakrushna has about 15 poems to his credit, among which the most famous one is Rasakollola. Rasa Binoda, Guna Sagar, Bhaba Samudra, Amruta Sagar, Tattva Sagar, Bhuta Keli, Alankora Bali and Naba Keli are some of his notable creations. He earned a great reputation in writing Chautisa and other lyrical poems about Radha and Krushna. The most recurrent themes of his writings are the glorification and the portrayal of the divine drama of deities he worshipped, viz, Jagannath, Radha and Krishna.

Rasakallola has a distinct place in Odia literature for its sheer poetic excellence and mellifluousness. It deals with the amours of Krushna with the maidens of Vraja and consists of 34 melodious cantos and each line of the cantos beings with the initial sound ‘ Ka’, the first consonant in sanscrit and Odia language. The cantos are again musically conditioned according to the Ragas and Raginis (tunes) prevalent in Odisha. Dinakrushna has shown great skill in painting the natural cycle of seasons and seasonal amours and romantic adventures associated with the seasons. Centering round the drama of Radha and Krushna, Dinakrushna has written many songs overflowing with a sort of mystically human and divine love.

References

Bibliography
 

1650 births
1710 deaths
Indian male poets
Odia-language poets
Poets from Odisha
People from Balasore district
Bhakti movement
Odissi music composers
17th-century Indian poets
18th-century Indian poets